Michael Kevin Taylor (born 17 January 1949) is an English guitarist, best known as a former member of John Mayall's Bluesbreakers (1967–1969) and the Rolling Stones (1969–1974). As a member of the Stones, he appeared on: Let It Bleed (1969), Get Yer Ya-Ya's Out! The Rolling Stones in Concert (1970), Sticky Fingers (1971), Exile on Main St. (1972), Goats Head Soup (1973) and It's Only Rock 'n Roll (1974).

Since leaving the Rolling Stones in December 1974, Taylor has worked with numerous other artists and released several solo albums. From November 2012 onwards he participated in the Stones' 50th-Anniversary shows in London and Newark, and in the band's 50 & Counting tour, which included North America, Glastonbury Festival and Hyde Park in 2013. He was ranked 37th in Rolling Stone magazine's 2011 list of the 100 greatest guitarists of all time. Guns N' Roses guitarist Slash states that Taylor had the biggest influence on him.

Biography

1949–1969: Early life
Taylor was born to a working-class family in Welwyn Garden City, but was raised in Hatfield, Hertfordshire, England, where his father worked as a fitter for the De Havilland aircraft company. He began playing guitar at age nine, learning to play from his mother's younger brother. As a teenager, he formed bands with schoolmates and started performing concerts under names such as The Juniors and the Strangers. They also appeared on television and put out a single. Part of the band was recruited for a new group called The Gods, which included Ken Hensley (later of Uriah Heep fame). In 1966, The Gods opened for Cream at the Starlite Ballroom in Wembley.

In 1965, at age 16, Taylor went to see a John Mayall's Bluesbreakers performance at "The Hop" Woodhall Community Centre, Welwyn Garden City. 

Taylor himself has said after seeing that Clapton hadn't appeared, but that his guitar had already been set up on the stage, he approached Mayall during the interval to ask if he could play with them. Taylor mentioned that he was familiar with the band's repertoire, and after a moment of deliberation, Mayall agreed. Taylor amended, "I wasn't thinking that this was a great opportunity ... I just really wanted to get up on stage and play the guitar."

After playing the second set, and garnering Mayall's respect in the process, Taylor left the stage, joined his friends and exited the venue before Mayall had the chance to speak with him. Still, this encounter proved to be pivotal in Taylor's career when Mayall needed someone to fill Peter Green's vacancy the following year, when Green quit to form Fleetwood Mac. Mayall placed a 'Guitarist Wanted' advert in the weekly Melody Maker music paper, and much to his relief immediately got a response from Taylor, whom he readily invited to join. Taylor made his debut with the Bluesbreakers at the Manor House, an old blues club in north London. For those in the music scene the night was an event ..."Let's go and see this 17-year-old kid try and replace Eric".
Taylor toured and recorded the album Crusade with John Mayall's Bluesbreakers. From 1966 to 1969, Taylor developed a guitar style that is blues-based with Latin and jazz influences. He is the guitarist on the Bluesbreaker albums Diary of a Band, Bare Wires, and Blues from Laurel Canyon. Later on in his career, he further developed his skills as a slide guitarist.

1969–1974: The Rolling Stones

After Brian Jones and the Rolling Stones parted ways in June 1969, John Mayall and Ian Stewart recommended Taylor to Mick Jagger. Taylor believed he was being called in to be a session musician at his first studio session with the Rolling Stones. An impressed Jagger and Keith Richards invited Taylor back the following day to continue rehearsing and recording with the band. He overdubbed guitar on "Country Honk" and "Live With Me" for the album Let It Bleed, and on the single "Honky Tonk Women" released in the UK on 4 July 1969.

Taylor's onstage debut as a Rolling Stone, at the age of 20, was the free concert in Hyde Park, London on 5 July 1969. An estimated quarter of a million people attended for a show that turned into a tribute to Brian Jones, who had died two days before the concert.

After the 1973 European tour, Richards' drug problems had worsened and begun to compromise the band's ability to function. Between recording sessions, the band members were living in various countries as UK income tax exiles, and during this period Taylor appeared on Herbie Mann's London Underground (1974) and also on Mann's album Reggae (1974).

1973–1975: It's Only Rock 'n Roll
In November 1973, Taylor underwent surgery for acute sinusitis and missed some of the sessions when the band began working on the LP It's Only Rock 'n Roll at Musicland Studios in Munich. Not much was achieved during the first ten days at Musicland, but most of the actual recordings were made there in January 1974, and in April at Stargroves, Jagger's estate in Hampshire. When Taylor resumed work with the band, he found it difficult to get along with Richards.

Not long after those recording sessions, Taylor went on a six-week expedition to Brazil, to travel down the Amazon River in a boat and explore Latin music. Just before the release of the album in October 1974, Taylor told Nick Kent from the NME about the new LP and that he had co-written "Till the Next Goodbye" and "Time Waits for No One" with Jagger. Kent told Taylor he had seen the finished artwork for the sleeve, which revealed the absence of any songwriting credits for Taylor.

Taylor appears in the promotional video for "Ain't Too Proud to Beg".

In December 1974, Taylor announced he was leaving the Rolling Stones. The bandmates were at a party in London when Taylor told Jagger he was quitting and walked out. Taylor's decision came as a shock to many. The Rolling Stones were due to start recording a new album in Munich, and the entire band was reportedly angry at Taylor for leaving at such short notice.

When interviewed by Jann Wenner of Rolling Stone in 1995, Wenner wrote that Jagger had stated that Taylor never explained why he had left, and surmised that "[Taylor] wanted to have a solo career. I think he found it difficult to get on with Keith."  In the same Wenner interview, Jagger had reportedly said of Taylor's contribution to the band: "I think he had a big contribution. He made it very musical. He was a very fluent, melodic player, which we never had, and we don't have now. Neither Keith nor Ronnie Wood (who replaced Taylor) plays that kind of style. It was very good for me working with him .... Mick Taylor would play very fluid lines against my vocals. He was exciting, and he was very pretty, and it gave me something to follow, to bang off. Some people think that's the best version of the band that existed". Asked if he agreed with that assessment, Jagger said: "I obviously can't say if I think Mick Taylor was the best, because it sort of trashes the period the band is in now." Charlie Watts stated: "I think we chose the right man for the job at that time just as Ronnie was the right man for the job later on. I still think Mick is great. I haven't heard or seen him play in a few years. But certainly what came out of playing with him are musically some of the best things we've ever done". In an October 2002 Guitar World interview, Richards reflected on his relationship with Taylor: "Mick Taylor and I worked really well together ... He had some lovely energy. Sweetly sophisticated playing, way beyond his years. Lovely sense of melody. I never understood why he left the Stones. Nor does he, I think ... I had no desire to see him go." Taylor later admitted in the 2012 documentary Crossfire Hurricane that he left because he wanted to protect his family from the drug culture surrounding the band. He further stated that in order to stay alive and fight his own demons (Taylor had turned into a drug addict himself by 1973), he needed to escape the realm of the Stones.

In an essay about the Rolling Stones published after Taylor's resignation, The New York Times music critic Robert Palmer wrote that "Taylor is the most accomplished technician who ever served as a Stone. A blues guitarist with a jazzman's flair for melodic invention, Taylor was never a rock and roller and never a showman."

Taylor has worked with his former bandmates on various occasions since leaving the Rolling Stones. In 1977 he attended London-based sessions for the John Phillips album Pay Pack & Follow, appearing on several tracks alongside Jagger (vocals), Richards (guitar) and Wood (bass).

On 14 December 1981 he performed with the band at their concert at the Kemper Arena in Kansas City, Missouri. Richards appeared on stage at a Mick Taylor show at the Lone Star Cafe in New York on 28 December 1986, jamming on "Key to the Highway" and "Can't You Hear Me Knocking"; and Taylor is featured on one track ("I Could Have Stood You Up") on Richards' 1988 album Talk is Cheap. The Rock and Roll Hall of Fame inducted Taylor along with the Rolling Stones in 1989. Taylor also worked with Bill Wyman's Rhythm Kings in the early 1990s.

In addition to his contributions to Rolling Stones albums released during his tenure with the band, Taylor's guitar is also on two tracks on their 1981 release Tattoo You: "Tops" and "Waiting on a Friend", which were recorded in 1972. (Taylor is sometimes mistakenly credited as playing on "Worried About You", but the solo on that track is performed by Wayne Perkins.)

Taylor's onstage presence with the Rolling Stones is preserved on the album Get Yer Ya-Ya's Out!, recorded over four concerts at Madison Square Garden in New York and the Baltimore Civic Center in November 1969, and on the album Brussels Affair (Live 1973), compiled from two shows recorded in Brussels on 17 October 1973 in the Forest National Arena, during their European Tour.  Taylor's live performances also feature in the documentary films Stones in the Park (released on DVD in 2001), Gimme Shelter (released in 1970) and Cocksucker Blues (unreleased); and in the concert film Ladies and Gentlemen: The Rolling Stones (shown in cinemas in 1974, and released on DVD and Blu-ray in 2010); these performances were also released on an album with the same title. Bootleg recordings from the Rolling Stones' tours from 1969 through 1973 also document Taylor's concert performances with the Rolling Stones.

For the 2010 re-release of Exile on Main St. Taylor worked with Jagger at a London studio (November 2009) to record new guitar and vocal parts for the previously unreleased song, "Plundered My Soul". The track was selected by the Rolling Stones for release as a limited edition single on Record Store Day.

On 24 October 2012, the Rolling Stones announced, via their latest Rolling Stone magazine interview, that Bill Wyman and Mick Taylor were expected to join the Rolling Stones on stage at the upcoming November shows in London. Richards went on to say that the pair would strictly be guests. At the two London shows on 25 and 29 November, Taylor played on "Midnight Rambler".

During an interview on the Late Night with Jimmy Fallon show (broadcast on 8 April 2013), Richards stated that Taylor would be performing with the Stones for their upcoming 2013 tour dates. Between 25 November 2012 and 13 July 2013 Taylor joined the Stones' 50 & Counting Tour performing at each of the 30 shows across Europe and North America, including sitting in on four songs at the Staples Center in Los Angeles and several numbers during their headline set at the Glastonbury Festival. The tour ended with two concerts at Hyde Park, London, which resulted in the album, Hyde Park Live and the concert film Sweet Summer Sun: Live in Hyde Park. He once again accompanied the Stones between 21 February and 22 November 2014 for the 29 dates of the 14 On Fire concerts across Asia, Europe and Australia/New Zealand.

1975–1981: Post-Stones

Taylor worked on various side projects during his tenure with the Rolling Stones. In June 1973, he joined Mike Oldfield onstage at the Queen Elizabeth Hall in a performance of Oldfield's Tubular Bells. Taylor was asked to take part in this project by Richard Branson as he felt Oldfield was unknown, having just been signed to Branson's fledgling label, Virgin Records. Taylor joined Oldfield once more for a BBC television broadcast in November 1973.

After his resignation from the Rolling Stones, Jack Bruce invited him to form a new band with keyboardist Carla Bley and drummer Bruce Gary. In 1975, the band began rehearsals in London with tour dates scheduled for later that year. The group toured Europe, with a sound leaning more toward jazz, including a performance at the Dutch Pinkpop festival, but disbanded the following year. A performance recorded on 1 June 1975 (which was finally released on CD in 2003 as "Live at the Manchester Free Trade Hall" by The Jack Bruce Band) and another performance from the Old Grey Whistle Test seem to be the only material available from this brief collaboration.

Taylor appeared as a special guest of Little Feat at the Rainbow Theatre in London, 1977, sharing slide guitar with then-frontman Lowell George on "A Apolitical Blues": this song appears on Little Feat's critically acclaimed live album Waiting for Columbus.

In the summer of 1977, he collaborated with Pierre Moerlen's Gong for the album Expresso II, released in 1978. Taylor began writing new songs and recruiting musicians for a solo album and worked on projects with Miller Anderson, Alan Merrill and others. He was present at many of the recording sessions for John Phillips' prospective second solo album. The recordings for Phillips' LP took place in London over a prolonged period between 1973 and 1977. This led to Taylor working with Keith Richards and Mick Jagger who were also involved with the album. The LP was to be released on the Stones' own label Rolling Stones Records (distributed by Atlantic Records). Ahmet Ertegun decided to pull the plug on the project after hearing alarming reports of excessive drug use by Phillips and Richards, but bootleg recordings of the sessions circulated among fans under the titles "Half Stoned" and "Phillips '77". Eventually Eagle Rock Records made funds available to restore the original, rescued tapes and the album finally saw an official release in 2002 as Pay Pack & Follow.

In 1977, Taylor signed a solo recording deal with Columbia Records. By April 1978 he had given several interviews to music magazines to promote a new, completed album which mixed rock, jazz and Latin-flavoured blues musical styles. The album, titled Mick Taylor, was finally released by Columbia Records in 1979 and reached No.119 on the Billboard charts in early August, with a stay of five weeks on the Billboard 200. CBS advised Taylor to promote the album through American radio stations but was unwilling to back him for any supporting tour. Frustrated with this situation, Taylor took a break from the music industry for about a year.

In 1981, he toured Europe and the United States with Alvin Lee of Ten Years After, sharing the bill with Black Sabbath. He spent most of 1982 and 1983 on the road with John Mayall, for the "Reunion Tour" with John McVie of Fleetwood Mac and Colin Allen. During this tour Bob Dylan showed up backstage at The Roxy in Los Angeles to meet Taylor.

In 1983, Taylor joined Mark Knopfler and played on Dylan's Infidels album. He also appeared on Dylan's live album Real Live, as well as the follow-up studio album Empire Burlesque. In 1984, Dylan asked Taylor to assemble an experienced rock and roll band for a European tour he signed with Bill Graham. Ian McLagan was hired to play piano and Hammond organ, Greg Sutton to play bass and Colin Allen, a long-time friend of Taylor, on drums. The tour lasted for four weeks at venues such as Munich's Olympic Stadium Arena and Milan's San Siro Stadium, sharing the bill with Carlos Santana and Joan Baez, who appeared on the same bill for a couple of shows.

1988–present

Taylor performed the lead guitar solo on the 1988 Joan Jett & the Blackhearts top-10 single, "I Hate Myself for Loving You". Taylor guested with the Grateful Dead on 24 September 1988 at the last show of that year's Madison Square Garden run in New York. Taylor lived in New York throughout the 1980s. He battled with addiction problems before getting back on track in the second half of the 1980s and moving to Los Angeles in 1990. During this time Taylor did session work and toured in Europe, America and Japan with a band including;
 either Eric Parker or Bernard Purdie on drums Wilbur Bascomb on bass and Max Middleton (formerly of the Jeff Beck Group), Shane Fontayne, and Blondie Chaplin. He also played on the Dramarama album Vinyl, a throwback to classic rock that Taylor was an important part of from the previous decade, playing all guitar tracks, which, ironically, included The Rolling Stones slide guitar song Memo From Turner. In 1990, his CD Stranger in This Town was released by Maze Records, backed up by a mini-tour including the record release party at the Hard Rock Cafe as well as gigs at the Paradise Theater.

He began what was to be a significant series of collaborations with L.A. based Carla Olson with their "Live at the Roxy" album Too Hot For Snakes, the centrepiece of which is an extended seven-minute performance of "Sway". Another highlight is the lead track on the album, "Who Put the Sting (On the Honey Bee)", by Olson's then-bassist Jesse Sublett. It was followed by Olson's Within An Ace, which featured Taylor on seven songs. He appeared on three songs from Reap The Whirlwind and then again on Olson's The Ring of Truth, on which he plays lead guitar on nine tracks, including a twelve-minute version of the song "Winter". Further work by Olson and Taylor can be heard on the Olson-produced Barry Goldberg album Stoned Again. Taylor went on to appear on Percy Sledge's Blue Night (1994), along with Steve Cropper, Bobby Womack and Greg Leisz.

After spending two years as a resident of Miami, during which time he played with a band called 'Tumbling Dice' featuring Bobby Keys, Nicky Hopkins and others, Taylor moved back to England in the mid-1990s. He released a new album in 1998 entitled A Stone's Throw. Playing at clubs and theatres as well as appearing at festivals has kept Taylor connected with an appreciative audience and fan base.

In 2003, Taylor reunited with John Mayall for his 70th Birthday Concert in Liverpool along with Eric Clapton. A year later, in autumn 2004, he also joined John Mayall and the Bluesbreakers for a UK theatre tour. He toured the US East Coast with the Experience Hendrix group during October 2007. The Experience Hendrix group appeared at a series of concerts to honour Jimi Hendrix and his musical legacy. Players included Taylor, Mitch Mitchell, Billy Cox, Buddy Guy, Hubert Sumlin and Robby Krieger.

On 1 December 2010, Taylor reunited with Ronnie Wood at a benefit gig arranged by blues guitarist Stephen Dale Petit to save the 100 Club in London. Other special guests at the show were Dick Taylor (first bassist in the Rolling Stones) and blues/jazz trombonist Chris Barber. Taylor toured the UK with Petit, appearing as his special guest, featured on a Paul Jones BBC Radio 2 session with him and guested on Petit's 2010 Classic Rock magazine Album of the Year, The Crave.

Taylor also helped to promote the Boogie for Stu album, recorded by Ben Waters to honour Ian Stewart (original Stones pianist and co-founder of the band), by taking part in a concert to mark the CD's official launch at the Ambassadors Theatre, London on 9 March 2011. Proceeds from the event were donated to the British Heart Foundation. Although Jagger and Richards didn't show up, Taylor noticeably enjoyed performing with Watts, Wood and Wyman, among others. In 2012, Taylor rejoined the Rolling Stones as a special guest on their 50 & Counting Tour, typically performing "Midnight Rambler" in a prominent lead guitar role.

Equipment
Throughout his career, Taylor has used various guitars, but is mostly associated with the Gibson Les Paul. His first Les Paul was bought when he was still playing with The Gods (from Selmer's, London in '65). He acquired his second Les Paul in 1967, not long after joining The Bluesbreakers: Taylor came to Olympic Studios to buy a Les Paul that Keith Richards wanted to sell. On the '72/'73 tours Taylor used a couple of Sunburst Les Paul guitars without a Bigsby. Other guitars include a Gibson ES-355 for the recording of Sticky Fingers and Exile on Main St., a Gibson SG on the 1969, 1970 and 1971 tours. and occasionally a Fender Stratocaster and a Fender Telecaster.. For the instructional DVD, Mick Taylor: Rock Blues and Slide Guitar, he uses a Stratocaster. He started using the Vigier Excalibur in 1997.

Though Taylor is primarily known as an electric guitarist he has also contributed acoustic guitar, bass guitar, backing vocals, keyboards and synthesizers to solo and guest recordings.

Personal life
Taylor has been married twice and has two daughters. Chloe (born 6 January 1971) is a daughter by his first wife, Rose Millar. Taylor married Millar in 1975 after leaving the Stones, but the relationship was reportedly "on the rocks" before long and resulted in divorce only a few years later. Taylor's daughter, Emma, was born from a short relationship with an American woman, Susan McMinamin, who sang backing vocals with Taylor's band on one occasion.

Awards
Inducted into the Rock 'n Roll Hall of Fame (with the Rolling Stones, 1989)
Taylor's handprints have been on Hollywood's RockWalk since 6 September 1998.
Taylor was ranked in 37th place by Rolling Stone magazine in its 2012 list of the 100 greatest guitarists of all time.

Discography

With John Mayall's Bluesbreakers
Crusade (Decca, 1967/LP; 1987/CD)
The Diary of A Band, Volumes 1 & 2 (Decca, 1968/2LP; 2007/2CD)
Bare Wires (Decca, 1968/LP; 1988/CD)
Blues from Laurel Canyon (Decca, 1968/LP; 1989/CD)
Back to the Roots (Polydor, 1971/LP; 2001/2CD)
Primal Solos (Decca, 1977/LP; 1990/CD) – selection of live recordings 1965 (with Eric Clapton), and 1968 (with Mick Taylor)
Return of the Bluesbreakers (AIM, 1985/LP; 1993/CD)
Wake Up Call (Silvertone, 1993/CD)
The 1982 Reunion Concert (Repertoire, 1994/CD) – with John Mayall, John McVie, and Colin Allen
Silver Tones: The Best of John Mayall & The Bluesbreakers (Silvertone, 1998/CD)
Along for the Ride (Eagle, 2001/CD)
Rolling with the Blues (Recall, 2005/2CD) – selection of live recordings 1972, 1973, 1980, and 1982
Essentially John Mayall (Eagle, 2007/5-CD box set)

With The Rolling Stones
Through the Past, Darkly (Decca, 1969) – (compilation) UK/US #2
Taylor plays on "Honky Tonk Women"
Let It Bleed (Decca, 1969) – UK #1 / US #3
Taylor plays on "Country Honk" and "Live With Me"
Live'r Than You'l Ever Be (?, 1969) – bootleg, certified Gold Album
Get Yer Ya-Ya's Out! (Decca, 1970) – UK #1 / US #6
Sticky Fingers (Rolling Stones Records, 1971) – UK/US #1
Gimme Shelter (Decca, 1971) – (compilation) UK #19
Hot Rocks 1964–1971 (Abkco Records, 1972) – (compilation) UK #3 / US #4
Exile on Main St. (Rolling Stones Records, 1972) – UK/US #1 
Rock'n'Rolling Stones (Decca, 1972) – (compilation) UK #41
Goats Head Soup (Rolling Stones Records, 1973) – UK/US #1
It's Only Rock 'n Roll (Rolling Stones Records, 1974) – UK #2 / US #1
Made in the Shade (Rolling Stones Records, 1975) – (compilation) UK #14 / US #6
Metamorphosis (Abkco Records, 1975) – UK #45 / US #8
Taylor plays on "I Don't Know Why" and "Jiving Sister Fanny".
Rolled Gold: The Very Best of the Rolling Stones (Decca, 1975) – (compilation) UK #7
Get Stoned (30 Greatest Hits) (ARCADE, 1977) – (compilation) UK #8
Sucking in the Seventies (Rolling Stones Records, 1981) – (compilation)US #15
Tattoo You (Rolling Stones Records, 1981) – UK #2 / US #1
Taylor plays on "Tops" and "Waiting on a Friend", both tracks recorded in 1972 during the Goats Head Soup sessions.
In Concert – Live 1966–70 (LONDON, 1982) – (live compilation) UK #94
Story of The Stones (K-tel, 1982) – (compilation) UK #24
Rewind (Rolling Stones Records, 1984) – (compilation) UK #23 / US #86
Singles Collection: The London Years. (Abkco Records, 1989) – US #91
Jump Back: The Best of The Rolling Stones (Rolling Stones Records, 1993) – UK #16 / US #30
Forty Licks (Rolling Stones Records, 2002) – (compilation) UK/US #2
Rarities 1971–2003 (Rolling Stones Records, 2005) – US #76
Taylor plays on "Let It Rock" (live 1971) and the 1974 b-side "Through The Lonely Nights".
Exile on Main St. (Rarities Edition) (Universal Records, 2010) – US #27
Taylor plays on "Pass The Wine (Sophia Loren)", "Plundered My Soul", "I'm Not Signifying", "Loving Cup (Alternate Take)", "Soul Survivor (Alternate Take)" and "Good Time Women".
Brussels Affair (Rolling Stones Records, 2011) – 1973 live performance
GRRR! (Rolling Stones Records, 2012) – (compilation) UK #3 / US #19
Hyde Park Live (Rolling Stones Records, 2013) – (2013 live performance) UK #16 / US #19
Taylor plays guitar on "Midnight Rambler", acoustic guitar and backing vocals on "(I Can't Get No) Satisfaction"
Tattoo You (Lost & Found - Rarities) (Universal Records, 2021) 
Taylor plays on "Living in the Heart of Love", "Come to the Ball" and "Fast Talking Slow Walking".

Non-Rolling Stones work with Rolling Stones members:
Pay Pack & Follow (Eagle Rock Records, 2001) – John Phillips solo album
from 1973–1979 recording sessions in London aka "Half Stoned" sessions
produced by Mick Jagger and Keith Richards
I've Got My Own Album to Do (Warner, 1974) – Ronnie Wood solo album
 Now Look (Warner, July 1975) – Ronnie Wood solo album. US #118
 Gimme Some Neck (Columbia, 1979) – Ronnie Wood solo album. US #45
Talk Is Cheap (BMG, 1988) – Keith Richards solo album. UK #37 / US #24

With Jack Bruce
Live on the Old Grey Whistle Test (Strange Fruit, 1995) – Tracks from several Old Grey Whistle Test shows recorded between '75 and '81. Seven of the songs feature Taylor on guitar.
Live at the Manchester Free Trade Hall (Polydor, 2003) – 2 CDs.

With Bob Dylan
Infidels (Columbia, 1983) – UK # 9 / US #20
Real Live (In Europe, 1984) (Columbia, 1984) – UK #54 / US #115
Empire Burlesque (Columbia, 1985) – UK #11 / US #33
The Bootleg Series Volumes 1–3 (Rare & Unreleased) 1961–1991 (Columbia, 1991) – UK #32 / US #49
The Bootleg Series Vol. 16: Springtime in New York 1980–1985 (Columbia, 2021). Featured on Discs 3-5 of the Deluxe Edition.

With Carla Olson
Too Hot For Snakes (?, 1991) –  Live at the Roxy; includes two Mick Taylor compositions: "Broken Hands" and "Hartley Quits".
Too Hot For Snakes Plus (Collectors' Choice, 2008) – 2-CD set of the Roxy album plus "You Gotta Move", and a second disc of 13 studio tracks from 1993 to 2004, including a previously unreleased versions of "Winter" and "Think I'm Goin' Mad" from the Olson-produced Barry Goldberg album Stoned Again.
Within An Ace (?, 1993) – Taylor performs on 7 of the 10 songs.
Reap The Whirlwind (?, 1994) – Taylor is featured on 3 tracks.
The Ring of Truth (2001) – Taylor plays on 9 of the 12 tracks.

Note: Too Hot For Snakes and The Ring of Truth were released by Fuel/Universal autumn of 2012 as a 2-CD set with 3 bonus tracks including 2 previously unreleased songs from the Roxy Theatre.
"Sway: The Best of Carla Olson & Mick Taylor" ~ a vinyl-only compilation, December 2020 on Sunset Blvd Records.

Solo discography
Studio albums
Mick Taylor (1979) US #119 (5 weeks in top 200)
A Stone's Throw (1998)

Live albums
Stranger in This Town (1990) (produced by Mick Taylor and Phil Colella)
Arthur's Club-Geneve 1995 (Mick Taylor & Snowy White) (Promo CD/TV Especial)
Coastin' Home [AKA Live at the 14 Below] (1995) re-issued 2002
14 Below (2003)
Little Red Rooster (2007) recorded live in Hungary during 2001 with the Mick Taylor Band

Other session work

Blues Masters vol. 10 (Champion Jack Dupree) (Blue Horizon, 1969) Recorded just weeks before he joined the Stones, according to producer Mike Vernon's liner notes.
Up Your Alley (Joan Jett & the Blackhearts) on "I Hate Myself for Loving You"
Tubular Bells Premiere (Mike Oldfield) (June '73) Queen Elizabeth Hall
Tubular Bells (Mike Oldfield) Telecast Tubular Bells Part One and Tubular Bells Part Two. Recorded at BBC Broadcasting House November 1973 and aired in early '74 and June '74. Available on Oldfield's Elements DVD.
The Tin Man Was A Dreamer (Nicky Hopkins) (1973)
London Underground (Herbie Mann) (Atlantic, 1973)
Reggae (Herbie Mann) (Atlantic, 1973)
Live European Tour (Billy Preston) (A&M Records, 1974). Recorded with the Rolling Stones Mobile Studio during their '73 tour. Preston opened up for the band with Mick Taylor on guitar. (Released on CD by A&M Japan, 2002.)
Have Blues Will Travel (Speedo Jones) (Integrity Records, 1988)
Reggae II (Herbie Mann) (Atlantic, 1973 [1976])
Just A Story From America (Elliott Murphy) (Columbia 1977)
Waiting for Columbus (Little Feat) (1978) double CD released 2002
Expresso II (Gong) (1978)
Downwind (Pierre Moerlen's Gong) (1979) lead guitar on "What You Know"
Alan Merrill (Alan Merrill)'s solo album (Polydor, 1985) recorded in London 1977
Vinyl (Dramarama) (1991)
John McVie's "Gotta Band" with Lola Thomas (1992)
Burnin' Blues (Coupe De Villes) (1992)
Piedra rodante (Tonky Blues Band) (1992)
Once in a Blue Moon (Gerry Groom) (1993)
Cartwheels (Anthony Thistlethwaite) (1993)
Hecho en Memphis (Ratones Paranoicos) (Sony Music) (1993)
Let's Get Stoned (The Chesterfield Kings) (Mirror Records,1994)
Crawfish and Caviar (Anthony Thistlethwaite)
Blue Night (Percy Sledge) (Virgin Records, 1994)
Black Angel (Savage Rose) (1995) guitar on "Black Angel" and "Early Morning Blues"
Навигатор (Аквариум, 1995) guitar on two tracks ("Не Коси", "Таможенный блюз")
Taylormade (Black Cat Bone, 1997), Music Maniac Records.
Mick & I (2001) Miyuki & Mick Taylor
The New York Times (Adam Bomb) (2001) (Taylor plays slide guitar on "MacDougal Street" & lead guitar on "Heaven come to me") produced by Jack Douglas
From Clarksdale To Heaven [various artists] (BlueStorm, 2002) – John Lee Hooker tribute album
Stoned Again (Barry Goldberg) (Antone's Records, 2002)
Meaning of Life (Todd Sharpville) (Cathouse/Universal, 2003)
Key To Love (Debbie Davies) (Shanachie Records, 2003)
Shadow Man (re-release of an album from 1996) (2003) – originally released by Alpha Music in Japan in 1996, this "Mick Taylor featuring Sasha" album should have read "Sasha featuring Mick Taylor", but the company felt it would sell better under a household name. It features Mick Taylor on guitar, but is basically a Sasha Gracanin album.
Treasure Island (Nikki Sudden) (Secretly Canadian, 2004)
Unterwegs (Crazy Chris Kramer) (2009)
Chicago Blues (Crazy Chris Kramer) (2010)

Music DVDs
Blues Alive video (RCA/Columbia Pictures 1983), recorded at Capitol Theatre, NJ 1982
Jamming with the Blues Greats – DVD release from the 1983 video, featuring John Mayall's Bluesbreakers (Mick Taylor, Colin Allen, John McVie) and special guests Albert King, Etta James, Buddy Guy, Junior Wells and Sippie Wallace (Lightyear/Image Entertainment 2005)
The Stones in the Park  concert video (Granada Television, 1969)
released on DVD (VCI, 2001)
Gimme Shelter (Maysles Films, 1970) music documentary film by Albert and David Maysles, shot at the Rolling Stones concerts at Madison Square Garden, NY on 27/28 November and Altamont, CA on 6 Dec December 1969.
restored and released on DVD (Criterion, 2000)

John Mayall, the Godfather of British Blues documentary about John Mayall's life and career (Eagle Rock, 2004. Region 1: 2005)
70th Birthday Concert (Eagle Rock, 2004. Region 1: 2005). Bluesbreakers Charity Concert (Unite for UNICEF) filmed in Liverpool, July 2003. John Mayall & the Bluesbreakers with special guests Chris Barber, Eric Clapton and Mick Taylor.
Stones in Exile 2010
Ladies & Gentlemen The Rolling Stones 2010

Music DVDs – Unofficial
Cocksucker Blues

Filmography
The Man Who Fell to Earth (1976) directed by Nicolas Roeg and starring David Bowie as Thomas Jerome Newton.
Taylor played guitar on various songs, including "Hello Mary Lou" after developing ideas for the soundtrack with John Phillips.
The Last of the Finest (1990) directed by John Mackenzie. Taylor assisted composer Jack Nitzsche with the moviescore.
Bad City Blues (1999) directed by Michael Stevens, based on the book by Tim Willocks.
Music composers: Mick Taylor and Max Middleton

References

External links

Mick Taylor official Facebook page
Interview with Gary James from classicbands.com
Interview with JAZZed Magazine. Oct 2007
Rolling Stone Magazine article about Exile on Main Street.

1949 births
Living people
English blues guitarists
English male guitarists
English rock guitarists
Lead guitarists
John Mayall & the Bluesbreakers members
The Rolling Stones members
Columbia Records artists
People from Welwyn Garden City
Slide guitarists
English film score composers
English male film score composers
Decca Records artists
Fingerstyle guitarists
British rhythm and blues boom musicians
Musicians from Hertfordshire
English blues singers
Bill Wyman's Rhythm Kings members
The Gods (band) members